Bengt Gustafsson (born 18 July 1943) is a Swedish astronomer and emeritus professor in theoretical astrophysics at Uppsala University.

He is known for his work in uniting cosmic science with culture and theology, and questioning space science from a humanistic point of view. Gustafsson received an honorary doctorate from the Faculty of Theology at Uppsala University in 2000.  In 2002, Gustafsson was awarded the grand prize of the Royal Institute of Technology, and has also been awarded the grand prize of Längmanska kulturfonden. At one point during his career, he was a counselor working for the government of Sweden.

He is a member of the Norwegian Academy of Science and Letters.

References

External links
Bengt Gustafsson

Members of the Norwegian Academy of Science and Letters
20th-century Swedish astronomers
21st-century Swedish astronomers
Academic staff of Uppsala University
1943 births
Living people
Members of the Royal Swedish Academy of Sciences